Weightlifting was part of the 1997 National Games of China held in Shanghai. Men competed in ten and women in nine weight classes.

The competition program at the National Games mirrors that of the Olympic Games as only medals for the total achieved are awarded, but not for individual lifts in either the snatch or clean and jerk. Likewise an athlete failing to register a snatch result cannot advance to the clean and jerk.

Medal summary

Men

Women

Medal table

References
Archived results of the 1997 Games 

1997 in weightlifting
1997 in Chinese sport
1997